"La même" is a song recorded by Congolese-French singer and rapper Maître Gims in collaboration with Vianney released in 2018. The song has peaked at number one on the French Singles Chart as well on the Belgian charts.

Charts

Weekly charts

Year-end charts

Certifications

References

2018 singles
2018 songs
Gims songs
SNEP Top Singles number-one singles
Ultratop 50 Singles (Wallonia) number-one singles
Songs written by Renaud Rebillaud
Songs written by Gims
Vianney (singer) songs